The 1997 Qatar Crown Prince Cup was the 3rd edition of this cup tournament in men's football (soccer). It was played by the top 4 teams of the Q-League.

Al-Arabi were crowned champions for the first time. It was the first tournament that saw the final go to penalties to decide the champion.

Results

Qatar Crown Prince Cup
1996–97 in Qatari football